Lachnocaulon (bogbutton) is a genus of plants in the Eriocaulaceae. It contains 7 known species, native to Cuba and to the southeastern United States (from Texas to Virginia).

 Lachnocaulon anceps (Walter) Morong - from Texas to Virginia; Isla de la Juventud in Cuba
 Lachnocaulon beyrichianum Sporl. ex Körn - Florida, Georgia, Alabama, North and South Carolina
 †Lachnocaulon cubense Ruhland - Cuba, apparently extinct
 Lachnocaulon digynum Körn - from eastern Texas to the Florida Panhandle
 Lachnocaulon ekmanii Ruhland - Cuba
 Lachnocaulon engleri Ruhland  - Florida, southern Alabama
 Lachnocaulon minus (Chapm.) Small - Florida, Georgia, Alabama, North and South Carolina

References

Eriocaulaceae
Poales genera